Willamette University College of Medicine is a former school of medicine that was part of Willamette University. Founded in 1867 as the first medical school in Oregon, the school relocated between Portland and the main university campus in Salem several times. The school was merged with the University of Oregon's medical school in Portland in 1913. That school later became Oregon Health & Science University.

History
In 1867, the College of Medicine was officially organized at Willamette. The school opened with 24 students led by Dr. Horace Carpenter. For two years prior the school had been teaching medicine. University president Joseph H. Wythe was one of the people credited with starting the school, but left due to internal faculty strife. Wythe taught several classes as well, including hygiene and microscopy at the medical school. Wythe had attended Philadelphia College of Medicine and graduated in 1850 before serving in the Civil War. In 1874, the school had 14 students and 11 professors. Women were attending the school of medicine by 1877. At this time the department was located in Waller Hall, then named University Hall.

In 1880 the College of Medicine moved to Portland, but returned to the Salem campus in 1895 in a dispute over privileges at the hospital. The school returned to Waller Hall, and also used other buildings in the area. Then in 1906 the school moved into a new building on the northwest section of the campus. By 1909 the school had an enrollment of 29 and a staff of 16. At that time entering students were not required to have even completed high school.

Merger
On September 1, 1913, the College of Medicine officially merged with the University of Oregon's medical school. Willamette's faculty retired and the 40 students transferred to Oregon's medical campus. At that time the University of Oregon's school was located in northwest Portland, Oregon on the campus of Good Samaritan Hospital. In 1919 the school would re-locate to Marquam Hill in southwest Portland where the school still stands as OHSU.

Alumni and faculty

Otto Saly Binswanger, professor
George H. Burnett, professor.
William A Cusick, graduated in 1867.
Melvin Clark George, professor.
Rodney Glisan, professor.
Daniel M. Jones, graduated in 1867.
Harry Lane (1855-1917), graduated in 1878.
John L. Martin, graduated in 1867.
Ross T. McIntire, (1889–1960), graduated in 1912
John H. Mitchell (1835-1905), professor of medical jurisprudence.
Dr. William B. Morse (1866-1944), graduated in 1891.
Orlando Plummer (1836-1913), professor and dean.
Levi L. Rowland (1831-1908), alumni, professor, and dean.
Loyal B. Stearns (1853-1936), alumni
Dr. B.L. Steeves (1868-1933), alumni.

See also
Oregon Institute
Methodist Mission

References

External links
Alumni

College of Medicine
Defunct private universities and colleges in Oregon
Educational institutions established in 1867
1913 disestablishments in Oregon
1867 establishments in Oregon